The Cathcart Challenge Cup was a Grade 2 National Hunt chase in Great Britain which was open to horses aged five years or older. It was run on the New Course at Cheltenham over a distance of about 2 miles and 5 furlongs (4,225 metres), and during its running there were seventeen fences to be jumped. The race was for first and second-season chasers, and it was scheduled to take place each year during the Cheltenham Festival in March.

The event was established in 1938, and it was named in honour of Frederick Cathcart, the clerk of the course and chairman at Cheltenham from 1908 to 1934. During its history the race had various formats, including a brief period as a hunter chase in the late 1970s.

The Cathcart Challenge Cup was last run in 2004, and it was replaced the following year by what is now known as the Ryanair Chase. Unlike the last version of the "Cathcart", the latter race is open to horses beyond their second year of chasing.

Records
Most successful horse since 1946 (2 wins):
 Quita Que – 1958, 1961
 Half Free – 1986, 1987
 Stormyfairweather – 1999, 2000

Leading jockey since 1946 (4 wins):
 Bryan Marshall – Leap Man (1946), Jack Tatters (1948), Semeur (1951), Coolrock (1952)

Leading trainer since 1946 (7 wins):
 Fred Winter – Soloning (1972), Soothsayer (1974), Roller Coaster (1979), Dramatist (1982), Observe (1983), Half Free (1986, 1987)

Winners 1946–2004
 Amateur jockeys indicated by "Mr".

 The 1947 edition was abandoned because of snow and frost.

 It was cancelled in 1949 due to frost, and in 1955 due to snow.

 The race was abandoned in 1975 due to waterlogging, and in 1978 because of snow.

 The 2001 running was cancelled because of a foot-and-mouth crisis.

See also
 Horseracing in Great Britain
 List of British National Hunt races

References
 Racing Post:

 racenewsonline.co.uk – Racenews Archive (8 March 2004).
 

National Hunt races in Great Britain
Cheltenham Racecourse
National Hunt chases
Recurring sporting events established in 1938
Discontinued horse races